Thiomonas bhubaneswarensis is a Gram-negative, oxidase- and catalase-positive, strictly aerobic, moderately thermophilic non-spore-forming, rod-shaped, motile bacterium with a single polar flagellum from the genus Thiomonas, which was isolated from hot-spring sediment samples in Atri in Bhubaneswar. T. bhubaneswarensis has the ability to oxidize thiosulfate.

References

External links
Type strain of Thiomonas bhubaneswarensis at BacDive -  the Bacterial Diversity Metadatabase

Comamonadaceae
Bacteria described in 2009